Old World Village is a German enclave in Huntington Beach, California. It features shops, restaurants, a chapel, and a hotel. Many of the proprietors of its businesses live above their establishments. This live-work arrangement is unusual for Orange County.

About 40 families live in the village. When it opened in 1978, the proprietors were primarily from Germany and Austria, but the Village has become more ethnically diverse over time.

History 

In 1952, Josef Bischof emigrated from Germany to the United States. He was inspired by Ports O' Call Village in San Pedro, to create the shopping center Alpine Village in Torrance in 1965. Wanting to have spaces to both live and work in the same place, he split with his business partners from Alpine Village to found Old World Village in 1978.

In the 1980s, the Village had an internal feud, with owners of the live-work establishments accusing Bischof of a "reign of terror". An initial $2.1 million judgment in favor of the merchants was later reduced to $1.25 million.

Festivals 

The Village holds annual German events, including an Oktoberfest and dachshund races. Over time, events for other ethnic and cultural groups have been held at the Village, including Greek, Irish, Scottish, and South American festivals. The village also hosts weddings and quinceañeras.

Legacy 

Old World Village was parodied in the television show Arrested Development as the English enclave "Wee Britain".

References 

1978 establishments in California
German communities in the United States
Huntington Beach, California
Neighborhoods in Orange County, California
Populated places established in 1978